The 2001 Swedish Golf Tour, known as the Telia Tour for sponsorship reasons, was the 16th season of the Swedish Golf Tour, a series of professional golf tournaments for women held in Sweden and Finland.

Maria Bodén and Pernilla Sterner both won two events, with Bodén winning the Order of Merit ahead of Sterner on account of three runner-up finishes.

Schedule
The season consisted of nine tournaments played between May and September, where one event was held in Finland.

Order of Merit

Source:

See also
2001 Swedish Golf Tour (men's tour)

References

External links
Official homepage of the Swedish Golf Tour

Swedish Golf Tour (women)
Swedish Golf Tour (women)